The 2010 CONCACAF Beach Soccer Championship was a continental beach soccer tournament, which took place between December 1 and December 5, 2010, in Puerto Vallarta, Mexico, for the third time in a row. Organizers had hoped to extend the number of teams participating from six to eight after seeing newcomers Bahamas compete in the previous competition, and this indeed materialized with Jamaica returning after four years and Guatemala joining the tournament. This meant that the competition took place between two groups of four in a round-robin format, with the top two teams in each group qualifying to the knockout stage.

Only the two finalists would be the nations to progress to play in the 2011 FIFA Beach Soccer World Cup the following year, these nations being hosts Mexico, and El Salvador, seeing last years qualifying nation Costa Rica, lose out on a spot at the world cup. All matches took place at Unidad Deportiva Municipal Agustín Flores Contreras in Puerto Vallarta.

Participating teams

Eight teams entered the tournament, the highest ever amount, with Guatemala being newcomers. Jamaica returned to the tournament after a four-year absence.

North American Zone:
 
 
 

Central American Zone:
 
 
 

Caribbean Zone:

Group stage
The draw to determine the groupings and schedule for the eight teams was held in Puerto Vallarta on November 24, 2010. For the draw, Mexico and the United States drew the top seeds in each group based on their current Beach Soccer Worldwide CONCACAF rankings, with Mexico being placed in Group A and the United States being placed in Group B. The remaining six teams were drawn from three pots (A, B and C), again based on their Beach Soccer Worldwide CONCACAF ranking from 2007 to 2009.

All match times are correct to that of local time in Puerto Vallarta time, being Central Standard Time, (UTC -6).

Group A

Group B

Knockout stage

Semi-finals

Third Place

Final

Winners

Awards

Teams Qualifying

Top scorers

12 goals
 Frank (Francisco Velasquez)
11 goals
 Jonathan Sanchez
8 goals
 Rohan Reid
6 goals
 Anthony Chimienti
 Antonio Barbosa
5 goals
 Marco Avila
 Jose Agustin Ruiz
4 goals
 Oscar Gil
3 goals
 Marcus Johnstone
 Nesley Jean
 Tomas Hernandez
 Jeffrey Chavarria
 Zak Ibsen

3 goals (cont.)
 Yuri Morales
 Ryan Futagaki
 Gustavo Rosales
2 goals
 Andre Reid
 William Leon
 Greivin Pacheco
 Bruno Xavier
 Walter Torres
 Victor Lopez
 Cameron Hepple
 Daron Beneby
 Luis Garcia
 Esau Polanco
 Morgan Plata
 Jevin Albuquerque
1 goal
 Franz Torres
 Fabian Davis
 Claudio Adanis
 Gavin Christie

1 goal (cont.)
 Ehren Hanna
 Jose Membreno
 Elias Ramirez
 Lesly St. Fleur
 Erick Suriano
 Kevin Wilson
 Tyler Hughes
 Jocelyn Roy
 Gagan Dosanjh
 Gregory Simpson
 Ricardo Villalobos
 Angel Saenz
 Raphael Xexeo
 Francis Farberoff
 Jason Campos
 Claudio Adanis
 Jose Calvo
Own goal
 Fabian Davis (for Canada )

Final standings

References
Day 1 Results
Day 2 Results
Day 3 Results
Semi-Final Results
Third Place and Final Results

Beach Soccer Championship
2011
2010–11 in Mexican football
International association football competitions hosted by Mexico
Qualification Concacaf
2010 in beach soccer